Nimenga is a rural locality (a settlement) and the administrative center of Nimengskoye Rural Settlement of Onezhsky District, Arkhangelsk Oblast, Russia. The population was 595 as of 2010. There are 11 streets.

Geography 
Nimenga is located on the Nimenga River, 979 km southwest of Onega (the district's administrative centre) by road. Maloshuyka is the nearest rural locality.

References 

Rural localities in Onezhsky District
Onezhsky Uyezd